P. G. Muthiah is an Indian director, cinematographer and film producer, who has been working in the Tamil film industry.

Career
Muthiah has started his career as Cinematographer in the movie Poo (2008) which won Tamil Nadu state awards and Kanden Kadhalai (2009), often collaborating in ventures by director R. Kannan. In 2015, Muthiah decided to produce films and financed three low budget drama films — Raja Manthiri (2016) and Peechankai (2017) — through his studio, PG Media Works. In 2018, he directed and produced the movie Madura Veeran starring Samuthirakani and Shanmuga Pandian.

Filmography

References

External links
 

Living people
Artists from Chennai
Cinematographers from Tamil Nadu
Tamil film cinematographers
21st-century Indian photographers
Film producers from Tamil Nadu
Tamil film producers
Film directors from Tamil Nadu
Tamil film directors
People from Tiruchirappalli district
1982 births